Barbro Kollberg (27 December 1917 – 6 March 2014) was a Swedish  film actress. Born in Eskilstuna, Södermanlands län, Sweden, she starred in Ingmar Bergman's 1946 It Rains on Our Love. She lived to be 96.

Selected filmography

 Life Begins Today (1939)
 Heroes in Yellow and Blue (1940)
 A Real Man (1940)
Home from Babylon (1941)
 Tonight or Never (1941)
 The Yellow Clinic (1942)
 Kungsgatan (1943)
 Som folk är mest (1944)
 It Rains on Our Love (1946)
 The Nuthouse (1951)
 Den gula bilen (1963)
 Mor gifter sig (1979) (TV Series)
 The Best Intentions (1991) (TV Series)
 Första Kärleken (1992) (Miniseries)
 A Life for the Taking (1995)
 As It Is in Heaven (2004)

References

External links

 

1917 births
2014 deaths
20th-century Swedish actresses
21st-century Swedish actresses